Muurla is a former municipality of Finland. It was consolidated with Salo on 1 January 2009.

It is located in the province of Western Finland and is part of the Southwest Finland region. The municipality had a population of 1,455 (2004-12-31) and covered an area of 83.16 km² of which 3.00 km² is water. The population density was 18.15 inhabitants per km².

The municipality was unilingually Finnish.

External links

http://www.muurla.fi – Official website 

Former municipalities of Finland
Salo, Finland
Populated places disestablished in 2009
2009 disestablishments in Finland